Jean de Quen (May  in Amiens, France – 8 October 1659, in Quebec City) was a French Jesuit missionary, priest and historian. As head of Jesuit missions of New France, he founded the missions to Saguenay. In 1647, Jean de Quen was the first European to reach the shores of Piékouagami (Lac Saint-Jean).

Early life
Born , in Amiens, Picardie, Jean de Quen was about 17-years-old when he joined the Jesuits on 13 September 1620. He taught for three years at the Collège in Eu, and then left for New France. He arrived at Quebec on 17 August 1635, where he taught at the College of Quebec, which opened that same year for French and First Nations boys. He taught there for two years before joining the Sillery mission, an initiative aimed at educating the native peoples. He later left the mission and went back to Quebec to minister to the parish of Notre-Dame-de-la-Recouvrance. After a fire destroyed the school, chapel and, Jesuits’ residence in 1640, he resumed his service in Sillery before moving on to a Trois-Rivières post, where he was involved in the establishing another mission.

In 1640, he went back to Sillery, and concerned himself with the hospital, Hôtel-Dieu. There he wore himself down; he recovered quickly, and was sent to the Trois-Rivières residence. He returned the following year to Sillery, and was in charge of that mission centre for eight years (1642–49). He fulfilled a very active ministry there, which brought him into contact with First Nations individuals from multiple locations, more particularly  Montagnais people, whose language he learned with proficiency.

Tadoussac
In the spring of 1642, Jean de Quen was entrusted with the Montagnais mission, with which he concerned himself for 11 years. This mission had been founded the preceding year at Tadoussac, where between spring and the end of August the fur trade brought First Nations people from all parts of the vast territory of the Saguenay. Father de Quen was respected by the Montagnais; with the aid of Fathers Jacques Buteux, Gabriel Druillettes, Martin de Lyonne, and Charles Albanel, he created a form of summer mission suited to the existence of these nomadic peoples, and made it successful. He formed a nucleus of Christians whom helped him to reach the most distant groups. It was at Tadoussac that the first stone church in Quebec was constructed, in 1646.

Lac Saint-Jean
No European had as yet officially explored the entire length of the Saguenay and the large lake which appeared on a map produced in 1544, by geographer Jean Alfonse. Previous explorers' attempts at getting to the lake proved futile, because the native peoples “avoided letting the white men know about [...] Lake Saint-Jean and the inland route to the Saguenay.” Jean de Quen expressed a desire to visit the members of the Porcupine nation who were prevented from coming to Tadoussac because of disease. He left the Tadoussac mission on 11 July 1647, in a small bark canoe. Bringing two Montagnais with him as guides, Jean de Quen travelled up the Saguenay to Chicoutimi, and took the river of the same name as far as lakes Kenogami and Kénogamishish. The group then entered Lake Saint-Jean via Belle-Rivière.

Upon seeing Lac St-Jean, Quen wrote in his journal: 
"This lake is so large, that one hardly sees its banks; it seems to be round in shape. It is deep and very full of fish; they fish here for pike, perch, salmon, trout, dories, white-fish, carp, and many other kinds. It is surrounded by a flat country, terminating in high mountains, distant 3, four or five leagues from its shores. It is fed by the waters of fifteen rivers, or thereabout, which serve as highways for the small nations which are back in the country, to come to fish in this lake, and to maintain the intercourse and friendship which they have among themselves."

In 1651, Father Jean de Quen founded the Ange-Gardien mission, the first permanent European settlement at Sept-Îles.

Quen died of fever on October 8, 1659, and was buried at Quebec City. His remains were discovered in 1878, and were transferred to the Ursuline chapel in 1891.

Legacy
The Centre d'histoire et d'archéologie de la Métabetchouane contains an exhibition discussing the life and works of Father Jean de Quen, as well as a memorial for the explorer.

The AV Jean de Quen in Quebec is named for him.

References

Sources
Virtual Museum Of New France
Dictionary of Canadian Biography Online

1600s births
1659 deaths
17th-century French Jesuits
French Roman Catholic missionaries
17th-century French historians
French explorers of North America
Explorers of Canada
French male non-fiction writers
Roman Catholic missionaries in Canada
Jesuit missionaries in New France